Salix gmelinii is a species of flowering plant belonging to the family Salicaceae.

Its native range is south-western Siberia to Central Asia.

References

gmelinii